Astictopterus is a genus of grass skippers in the family Hesperiidae. There are two species groups, one Afrotropical, the other Indomalayan.

Species
Astictopterus anomoeus (Plötz, 1879) – yellow hopper
Astictopterus bruno (Evans, 1937)
Astictopterus inornatus (Trimen, 1864) – modest sylph
Astictopterus jama C. & R. Felder, 1860 – forest hopper 
Astictopterus punctulata (Butler, 1895)

Former species
 Astictopterus abjecta (Snellen, 1872) – abject hopper - transferred to Isoteinon abjecta (Snellen, 1872)
 Astictopterus armatus Druce, 1873 - transferred to Kerana armatus (Druce, 1873)
 Astictopterus butleri de Nicéville, [1884] - transferred to Koruthaialos butleri (de Nicéville, [1884])
 Astictopterus ozias Hewitson, 1878 - transferred to Oz ozias (Hewitson, 1878)
 Astictopterus stellata (Mabille, 1891) – spotted sylph or fairy - transferred to Dotta stellata (Mabille, 1891)
 Astictopterus tura Evans, 1951 - transferred to Dotta tura (Evans, 1951)

Biology 
The larvae feed on Gramineae, Marantaceae, Acanthaceae  including Miscanthus sinensis, Phrynium spicatum, Asystasia

References

Natural History Museum Lepidoptera genus database

External links
Astictopterus at funet
Seitz, A. Die Gross-Schmetterlinge der Erde 13: Die Afrikanischen Tagfalter. Plate XIII 77

Astictopterini
Hesperiidae genera